was king of the Ryukyu Kingdom from 1795 to 1802. He made a great contribution to the education of Ryukyu during his reign.

Shō On was the eldest grandson of the former king, Shō Boku. His father Shō Tetsu died when Shō Boku was still alive, so he became the Heir apparent of the kingdom. After Shō Boku's death, Shō On was installed as the king. However, Shō On was only 11 years old, his teacher Sai Seishō (蔡世昌) became the Kokushi (国師), serving as the king's regent.

The Kokugaku (国学) was established as the National Academy of the Ryukyu Kingdom in Shuri Castle on 1798. Four schools were also founded in the countryside, even farmers could receive education.

But the idea of equal education was not accepted by the Kumemura people, so they launched a rebellion against the reform, and Sai Seishō died in the incident. The rebellion was quickly put down, and some education privileges of Kumemura people were abolished.

Shō On died when he was only 18 years old. His successor was his only child, the infant Shō Sei, who died 1 year later. Shō On's younger brother Shō Kō succeeded.

References
『中山世譜・尚温王』
田名真之「蔡世昌」（『沖縄大百科事典』（沖縄タイムス社、1983年））
中山盛茂「高島親方（蔡世昌）（『琉球史事典』（琉球文教出版、1969年））

Second Shō dynasty
Kings of Ryūkyū
1784 births
1802 deaths